Putu Oka Sukanta (born 29 July 1939 in Singaraja, Bali, Indonesia) is a versatile Indonesian author of fiction and poetry. He wrote poetry, short stories and novels while still in Bali and after he moved to Yogyakarta and Jakarta.
From 1966, during the New Order, he was imprisoned without trial as an alleged member of LEKRA. After his release in 1976, he has come to be known as a writer, journalist and an expert in the field of traditional medicine.

Biography 
Putu Oka Sukanta started writing at age 16. He actively wrote poetry, short stories, novels and children's stories while in his native Bali before moving to Yogyakarta and Jakarta.
In 1966, in the crackdown following the 30 September Movement, he was imprisoned in Salemba in Jakarta as an alleged member of LEKRA. The years 1965 and ’66 were tumultuous ones in Indonesian history.  A high school teacher, he had been dismissed from his job before his arrest. He spent the next 10 years behind bars with no idea of how long he would be there.

After his release in 1976, he continued to have difficulty publishing due to surveillance and censorship.  Some of his texts were not available in Indonesia but in Germany and Australia, contributing to his reputation abroad but not at home.

In 1982 and 1983, Putu had an opportunity to attend the Popular Theatre Workshop in Sri Lanka and Bangladesh.

Some of his works are published in foreign languages. He is also a contributing editor and a senior staff member of an alternative magazines. They are also available in Indonesian Progressive Contemporary Poetry (Indonesia, 1963), The Prison Where I Live (London, 1996), Voice of Consciences (USA, 1995), Bali Behind The Seen (Australia, 1997), Black Cloud Over Paradise Isle (USA, 1997), Manageri IV (Indonesia, 1998), and Silenced Voices (Hawaii, 2000).

He is also the producer of many documentary films, one of which portrays the social impact of the tragic events of 1965 when hundreds of thousands of Indonesians fell victim to nationwide massacres.

Besides being known as a writer, he acquired expertise in the field of traditional medicine. During the time being captured in Salemba jail, Putu studied acupuncture and acupressure from a Chinese doctor who placed in the same cell. After his release from prison in 1978, he went to Taipei and Hong Kong to deepen the knowledge. In 1980, he established the Foundation for Traditional Medicine in Indonesia.
He was married to Endah Lasmadiwati in 1987. In 1990, he was put back in jail due to his efforts to teach traditional medicine on the people suspected by the government. Throughout the New Order regime, he was never released from surveillance even while abroad. After his release from prison, Putu and his wife continued to gather herbs grown in Indonesia for their foundation. His expertise in acupuncture and herbs has taken him around the world in 23 countries. Now Putu Oka Sukanta to the Central Executive of the Association of Indonesian Naturopath Ikatan Naturopatis Indonesia. The Foundation facilitates to conduct research on traditional treatment methods for patients with HIV / AIDS.

Publications
 Putu Oka Sukanta 
 Putu Oka Sukanta 
 Putu Oka Sukanta 
 Putu Oka Sukanta 
 Putu Oka Sukanta 
 Putu Oka Sukanta 
 Putu Oka Sukanta 
 Putu Oka Sukanta 
 Putu Oka Sukanta 
 Putu Oka Sukanta 
 Putu Oka Sukanta 
 Putu Oka Sukanta 
 Putu Oka Sukanta 
 Putu Oka Sukanta 
 Putu Oka Sukanta 
 Putu Oka Sukanta 
 Putu Oka Sukanta

References

External links
 Taman Sringanis
The brutal truth about the 1965 massacres in Indonesia – Pacific Media Centre
Putu Oka Sukanta's Books
 Biography of Sukanta, Putu Oka | Southeast Asia Digital Library

Indonesian male writers
Indonesian male novelists
Indonesian male short story writers
20th-century Indonesian writers
21st-century Indonesian writers
20th-century Indonesian poets
21st-century Indonesian poets
Indonesian film producers
Indonesian journalists
Members of the Lembaga Kebudajaan Rakjat
Indonesian activists
Indonesian political prisoners
Living people
People from Buleleng Regency
Balinese people
1939 births